Umberto Elia Terracini (Genoa, 27 July 1895 – Rome, 6 December 1983) was an Italian politician.

Biography

Early years 

Terracini was born in Genoa on 27 July 1895 to a Jewish family originally from Piedmont. After completing his elementary education, Umberto attended a Jewish school, whose programs corresponded to the ministerial ones, except for the addition of the study of the language and the history of Israel; he did not derive any religious interest from his family or school, even though he regularly attended the synagogue. In those years, he began to attend the Civic Library, reading popular novels of authors like Victor Hugo, Edmondo De Amicis, Émile Zola and Eugène Sue.

Before the beginning of World War I, he approached the Italian Socialist Party and in 1913 he was enrolled in the Faculty of Law of the University of Turin. Terracini immediately expressed his opposition to Italy's entry into the war. After a pacifist rally he held on 15 September 1916  he was arrested and sentenced to a month in prison. After release he was drafted and sent to the front in 1917 near Montebelluna.

After the war Terracini resumed his studies graduating in 1919 and began his career as a lawyer. He also befriended Antonio Gramsci and Palmiro Togliatti, whom he worked as an aide for; the three of them would found  L'Ordine Nuovo in 1919. In 1921 Terracini, under Gramsci and Togliatti, contributed to the foundation of the Communist Party of Italy. In September 1926, Terracini was arrested as an opponent of the fascist regime and sentenced to 22 years of prison: he spent 11 years in jail and subsequently was held in  confinement in Ponza and on Santo Stefano Island. He was freed by the partisans in 1943. In those years he expressed his opposition to the Molotov–Ribbentrop Pact.

Constituent Assembly 
Terracini was elected Deputy and vice-president of the Constituent Assembly in 1946 and became president after the resignation of Giuseppe Saragat the following year. He signed the Italian Constitution along with the Head of State Enrico De Nicola and the Prime Minister Alcide De Gasperi.

Later years 
Terracini was favorable to the alliance with the socialists in the Popular Democratic Front, and after the shooting on Togliatti in July 1948, he presented a no-confidence motion to the government led by the Christian Democracy, which he believes has the moral and political responsibility on the attack to the Communist leader.

Terracini was very critical with Nikita Khrushchev for his report on the war crimes committed by Stalin, which he argued the secretary of the CPSU was too soft with his predecessor. He supported the intervention of Soviet troops against the Hungarian Revolution of 1956.

Terracini confirmed his seat in the Senate of the Republic from 1948 until his death. He became the party's candidate for President of Italy at the 1962 elections and the 1964 elections, but was defeated by Antonio Segni first and then by Giuseppe Saragat.

During the 1970s he was very critical about the Historic Compromise between the Communist Party and the Christian Democracy.

Terracini died in Rome on 6 December 1983, at the age of 88.

References

External links 
Files about his parliamentary activities (in Italian): Constituent Assembly
Files about his parliamentary activities (in Italian): I, II, III, IV, V, VI, VII, VIII, IX, Legislature

1895 births
1983 deaths
20th-century Italian Jews
Politicians from Genoa
Italian anti-fascists
Italian Communist Party politicians
Italian prisoners and detainees
Italian resistance movement members
Jewish anti-fascists
Jewish Italian politicians
University of Turin alumni
Senators of Legislature I of Italy
Senators of Legislature II of Italy
Senators of Legislature III of Italy
Senators of Legislature IV of Italy
Senators of Legislature V of Italy
Senators of Legislature VI of Italy
Senators of Legislature VII of Italy
Senators of Legislature VIII of Italy
Senators of Legislature IX of Italy